Euphorbia denisiana is a species of plant in the family Euphorbiaceae. It is endemic to Madagascar.  It is threatened by habitat loss.

References

Endemic flora of Madagascar
denisiana
Vulnerable plants
Taxonomy articles created by Polbot